The 2006 Hamilton Tiger-Cats season was the 49th season for the team in the Canadian Football League and their 57th overall. The Tiger-Cats finished in 4th place in the East Division with a 4–14 record and missed the playoffs. Head coach Greg Marshall was fired after the first four games of the season and Ron Lancaster took over as interim head coach for the remaining 14 games.

Offseason

CFL Draft

Preseason

Regular season

Season standings

Season schedule

Player stats

Passing

Rushing

Receiving

Awards and records

2006 CFL All-Stars
 No players selected

Eastern Division All-Star Selections
 Tay Cody - Defensive Back

References

Hamilton Tiger-Cats seasons
Hamilton